Anguina funesta  is a plant pathogenic nematode.

References 

Agricultural pest nematodes
Tylenchida
Nematodes described in 1979